Eumerus strigatus , (Fallén, 1817), the  Onion Bulb Fly , is a  fairly common species of syrphid fly observed acoss Europe. Also found in north-central North America and other scattered locations as an introduced species from infested bulbs.  Syrphid flies are also known as Hover Flies or Flower Flies because the adults are frequently found hovering around flowers from which they feed on nectar and pollen. The larvae feed on various bulbs.
.

Description
External images
For terms, see: Morphology of Diptera.

Wing length: .
Stigma are yellowish or light brown. Femora 3 is simple. Tergites are blackish, absolutely without reddish-brown markings. Male ocelli are in an equilateral triangle. Male genitalia figured by  Van Veen (2004). 
 
 The Larva is described and figured by Heiss (1938) .

Distribution
Palaearctic, Fennoscandia South to Iberia and the Mediterranean basin, Ireland east through Europe into Turkey and  Russia. Also, from the Urals to the Pacific coast (Sakhalin) and Japan. Introduced to the Nearctic and Australia and New Zealand.

Biology
The habitat is wetlands, deciduous woodland, open ground, seasonally-flooded grassland,
and open, dry unimproved pasture, including dune grassland. Also in horticultural land and suburban gardens. In dry grassland often settles on the ground, on stones etc. Flowers visited include umbellifers, Allium ursinum, Convolvulus, Eschscholzia californica, Euphorbia, Fragaria, Leontodon, Papaver, Potentilla erecta, Ranunculus, Sonchus arvensis, Taraxacum. The flight period is May to September. A bulb feeder. It is a minor pest of Liliaceae, parsnip, carrot, potato, asparagus, artichoke roots (Cynara scolymus).

References

Diptera of Europe
Eristalinae
Eumerini
Insects described in 1817
Taxa named by Carl Fredrik Fallén